Hugo Hanashiro (born 8 April 1981) is a Brazilian table tennis player. He competed in the men's doubles event at the 2004 Summer Olympics.

References

1981 births
Living people
Brazilian male table tennis players
Olympic table tennis players of Brazil
Table tennis players at the 2004 Summer Olympics
Sportspeople from São Paulo
21st-century Brazilian people